Peter Rees is a film and television writer, director, and producer. He created and developed the concept and was the executive producer of the television series MythBusters. Rees won the 1993 Charles Heidsieck International Travel Challenge, and with his race partner, Peter Coleman, wrote and directed a documentary about the event, In the Footsteps of Champagne Charlie.

References

Further reading 
 Slashdot: The MythBusters Answer Your Questions

External links 
 

American film producers
Australian television producers
Living people
Discovery Channel people
Year of birth missing (living people)